Alfred Dünmann (5 December 1884 – 5 June 1942), commonly known as Fritz Dünmann, was an Austrian footballer who played as a striker. He played in three matches for the Austria national football team from 1906 to 1907.

Dünmann was born in Vienna. He played as a striker for Rapid Wien and for the Austria national team, earning three caps from 1906 to 1907, and scoring two goals.

Being a Jew, Dünmann was deported to Dachau concentration camp in the November pogrom in 1938, but was released and went into exile in France. However, he was imprisoned again in 1941, and was deported via various intermediate camps to Auschwitz concentration camp, where he was eventually murdered on 5 June 1942.

References

External links
 

1884 births
1942 deaths
Austrian footballers
Austria international footballers
Footballers from Vienna
Association football forwards
SK Rapid Wien players
Austrian people who died in Auschwitz concentration camp
Austrian Jews who died in the Holocaust
Jewish emigrants from Austria after the Anschluss
Jewish emigrants from Nazi Germany to France
Dachau concentration camp survivors